Shane Kelly is an Irish jockey. He is a native of Cloone, County Leitrim.

He was trained at the RACE academy in the Curragh, County Kildare. He is a former Irish Amateur Jockey Champion.

He is based in the UK and has had over 300 winners to date.

On 22 January 2014 he rode two winners on the same day as part of a successful betting coup organised by gambler Barney Curley. Betting on a 4 horse winning accumulator netted approximately 4 million pounds.

References

External links
Profile

Irish jockeys
Living people
Year of birth missing (living people)
Place of birth missing (living people)
Sportspeople from County Leitrim